The Night of the Pencils (in ), was a series of kidnappings and forced disappearances, followed by the torture, rape, and murder of a number of young students (underage boys and girls) that began on the evening of 16 September 1976 and continued into the next day, during Argentina's last civil-military dictatorship.

Background

In March 1976 the Argentine military seized power following a coup d'état. The military junta then implemented what was called the National Reorganization Process which was a set of policies used by the regime to destroy left-wing guerrilla forces and oppress resistance to its rule. The process included kidnappings, torture and murder. Meanwhile, the Montoneros, a leftist guerilla group, responded violently to the junta and its actions as they enlisted other Argentines to join their campaign against the regime. Those enlisted included young, left-wing, politically active students from the organization named the Unión de Estudiantes Secundarios (Union of High School Students) of La Plata. The UES was committed to achieving school reforms and other political reforms, through demonstrations and protests that irked the ruling regime.

Causes
The circumstances of the kidnappings, in conjunction with the testimony of one of the survivors, Pablo Díaz, are the reason many hold the view that the kidnappings were a direct consequence of these peaceful protests and that Pablo had nothing to do with the guerrillas. However, Antonius C. G. M. Robben, Professor of Anthropology at Utrecht University wrote:

At 4:00 A.M. on 21 September 1976, Pablo Diaz was taken from his home, hooded, thrown into a car, and taken to La Arana police station in La Plata. They interrogated him briefly about the upcoming student protest and his alleged guerrilla activities. They also brought in another captive, and asked him about Pablo Diaz. The blindfolded man did not know that Pablo was present and responded that Pablo Diaz sympathized with the Guevarist Youth.

Several hundred guerrillas of the Guevarist Youth Group disappeared in a series of gun battles and abductions between 1976 and 1977, after it was discovered they were planning to mount a military offensive during the 1978 World Cup in Argentina.

On 15 September 1998, one of the survivors, Emilce Moler, revealed that the student's benefits' demands were not the reason behind the kidnappings, but because the military regime believed the students were linked to the Montoneros and People's Revolutionary Army.

Jorge Falcone, the brother of one of the kidnapped students, María Claudia Falcone, has maintained that her activities against the military dictatorship went beyond student protests, and that on the day she was kidnapped she was hiding weapons in her aunt's residence and was prepared to use them. He wrote his sister was not a victim, or a martyr, but a hero of the organization Montoneros.

He also defended his sister's commitment to the Montoneros guerrilla movement in Argentina:

My sister wasn't Little Red Riding Hood whom the wolf gulped down. She was a revolutionary militant. . . . The militant was the type [of person] who, in a moment, could send a molotov flying in a lightning act. . .  They could also carry out support action in a major military operation.

Whatever the exact reason for the kidnappings and murders the junta was undoubtedly fearful of the Montoneros and others who orchestrated opposition to the military junta. Thus they sought to destroy any opposition including the UES, that supplied fighters to the ERP. Colonel Ramón Camps, head of the Buenos Aires Provincial Police, and Director of Investigations Miguel Etchecolatz were tasked with eliminating the UES.

The kidnappings

On 16 and 17 September 1976, masked men raided homes under cover of darkness, taking students away to clandestine detention centres in what became known as the "Night of the Pencils". It concluded five days later when Camps' henchmen kidnapped student Pablo Diaz. He was taken to a detention center in Arana, joining his fellow high school activists, where they were brutally tortured.
At some point in late September, a large group of detainees which included the students was herded into two police vans. The convoy stopped at the Investigations Brigade of Bánfield headquarters, where a number of people were forced to get out. Díaz was among them.

The kidnapped students were:

Aftermath
Details of the Night of the Pencils were provided by the two of the three survivors from that 16–21 September period. Emilce Moler said: "They tortured us with profound sadism. I remember being naked. I was just a fragile small girl of about 1.5 m and weighed about 47 kg, and I was beaten senseless by what I judged was a huge man" and "after about a week at our first detention centre, we were all taken to another place in a truck. At some point we stopped and some of my friends were taken out. Those are the ones that disappeared." Moler said that she did not know why some UES members were allowed to live and others killed. Like most of the others, Emilce belonged to the students' union. The military regarded them as subversives.

Pablo Diaz testified: "In Arana, they gave me electric shocks in my mouth, my gums, and my genitals. They tore out one of my toenails. It was very usual to spend several days without food."

On 28 December 1976, an Army Major told Díaz he would become a legal prisoner and was transferred to the Pozo de Quilmes, where he joined Moler, Calotti and Miranda. Those who were still being held at Banfield are presumed to have been taken out and executed by firing squad on the first week of January 1977.

In September 2011 nearly two dozen junta officials were charged with crimes against humanity for their roles in the Night of the Pencils. Among them was Miguel Etchecolatz, already serving a life sentence for other crimes committed as an officer in the regime.

Today the victims of the Night of the Pencils are remembered, along with thousands of other victims of the dictatorship, on March 24, the Argentine Day of Remembrance for Truth and Justice. Night of the Pencils is also now seen as the opening salvo in Argentina's Dirty War.

In popular culture

 The saga of the students' ordeal was depicted in Hector Olivera's 1986 film Night of the Pencils. 
 The testimony of Pablo Díaz, the last survivor to be released, served as the basis for the song "Noche de los lápices" by Canarian singer .

See also
 National Commission on the Disappearance of Persons
 Ramón Camps
 Miguel Etchecolatz
 Christian von Wernich
 Montoneros
 National Reorganization Process
 Dirty War

References

Bibliography
 Seoane, María y Hector Ruiz Nuñez: La Noche de los Lápices. Buenos Aires: Sudamericana, 2003.   Registro en Cámara Argentina del Libro] 
 Comisión Nacional sobre la Desaparición de Personas (CONADEP): Nunca más. Buenos Aires: Eudeba, 1984.

External links
CASO Nº 33: FALCONE, MARÍA CLAUDIA 

Dirty War
Executed activists
1976 in Argentina
Political repression in Argentina
Enforced disappearance
Extrajudicial killings
Student political organizations